The Fallon City Hall, at 55 E. Williams Ave. in Fallon, Nevada, was built between 1930 and 1931.  It was designed by architect Frederick DeLongchamps in Mission/Spanish Revival style.  It is a 14,000 square foot one-story building built over a high basement.

It was listed on the National Register of Historic Places in 2004. It was deemed significant for its association with local politics and government, and "as a rare
example of the Spanish Colonial Revival style in Fallon and as a work of a master, pre-eminent
architect Frederick DeLongchamps."  At the time of its NRHP listing it had continuously served as city hall since 1931.

References 

Mission Revival architecture in Nevada
Government buildings completed in 1931
City halls in Nevada
National Register of Historic Places in Churchill County, Nevada
City and town halls on the National Register of Historic Places in Nevada
Frederic Joseph DeLongchamps buildings